Newton High School may refer to:

Newton High School (Georgia) — Covington, Georgia
Newton High School (Illinois) — Newton, Illinois
Newton High School (Iowa) — Newton, Iowa
Newton High School (Kansas) — Newton, Kansas
Newton High School (Mississippi) — Newton, Mississippi
Newton High School (New Jersey) — Newton, New Jersey
Newton High School (Ohio) — Pleasant Hill, Ohio
Newton High School (Texas) — Newton, Texas
Newton Christian High School — Newton, Kansas
Newton-Conover High School — Newton, North Carolina
Newton Falls High School — Newton Falls, Ohio
Newton North High School — Newton, Massachusetts (known as Newton High School prior to 1974)
Newton South High School — Newton, Massachusetts (established 1960)
East Newton High School — Granby, Missouri
North Newton Junior-Senior High School — Morocco, Indiana
South Newton High School — Kentland, Indiana

See also
Newtown High School (disambiguation)